Wesley King is a Canadian author of young adult fiction books. Both his novels with the late Kobe Bryant debuted at #1 on The New York Times Best Seller list. He currently resides in Lake Echo, Nova Scotia.

Biography 
King was born in Ajax, Ontario and graduated with a Journalism Degree from Carleton University. He began working on his first novel soon after, The Vindico, and has written thirteen novels as of 2022.

In 2016, King was approached by Kobe Bryant to collaborate on a new children series. The first instalment, Training Camp, was released in 2019 and debuted as a #1 New York Times bestseller. The second instalment, Season One, was released in March 2020 after Bryant's death and also became a #1 New York Times bestseller.

King publicly discusses his struggle with mental health, specifically surrounding Obsessive–compulsive disorder and Generalized anxiety disorder. He wrote the bestselling novel OCDaniel in 2016 which described his experiences growing up and won an Edgar Award. He published a prequel to the series in 2020.

Published works 
 Butt Sandwich & Tree (Paula Wiseman Books, 2022)
 Hello (from here) (Dial Books, 2021)
 Sara and the Search for Normal (Paula Wiseman Books, 2020)
 The Wizenard Series: Season One (Granity Studios, 2020)
 The Wizenard Series: Training Camp (Granity Studios, 2019)
 A World Below (Paula Wiseman Books, 2018)
 Laura Monster Crusher (Penguin Canada, 2017)
 Enemy of the Realm (Razorbill, 2017)
 OCDaniel (Paula Wiseman Books, 2016) 
 Dragons vs. Drones (Razorbill, 2016)
 The Incredible Space Raiders (from Space!) (Paula Wiseman Books, 2015)
 The Feros (G.P Putnam's Sons, 2014)
 The Vindico (G.P Putnam's Sons, 2014)

References

External links 

Writers from Nova Scotia
Kobe Bryant
Living people
Canadian writers of young adult literature
Canadian children's writers
21st-century Canadian male writers
Year of birth missing (living people)
People from Ajax, Ontario
People from Halifax, Nova Scotia
People with obsessive–compulsive disorder
Carleton University alumni